The American Association of Physics Teachers (AAPT) was founded in 1930 for the purpose of "dissemination of knowledge of physics, particularly by way of teaching." There are more than 10,000 members in over 30 countries. AAPT publications include two peer-reviewed journals, the American Journal of Physics and The Physics Teacher. The association has two annual National Meetings (winter and summer) and has regional sections with their own meetings and organization. The association also offers grants and awards for physics educators, including the Richtmyer Memorial Award, and programs and contests for physics educators and students. It is headquartered at the American Center for Physics in College Park, Maryland.

History
The American Association of Physics Teachers was founded on December 31, 1930, when forty-five physicists held a meeting during the joint APS-AAAS meeting in Cleveland specifically for that purpose.

The AAPT became a founding member of the American Institute of Physics after the other founding members were convinced of the stability of the AAPT itself after a new constitution for the AAPT was agreed upon.

Contests
The AAPT sponsors a number of competitions. The Physics Bowl, Six Flags' roller coaster contest, and the US Physics Team are just a few. The US physics team is determined by two preliminary exams and a week and a half long "boot camp." Each year, five members are selected to compete against dozens of countries in the International Physics Olympiad (IPHO).

See also 
 The Physics Teacher
 Oersted Medal
 American Institute of Physics
 American Journal of Physics
 Physics outreach

References

External links 
 American Association of Physics Teachers web page
 AAPT sponsored events 
 Finding Aid for the American Association of Physics Teachers, South Atlantic Coast Section Records at the University of North Carolina at Greensboro

 
Physics education
Physics societies
Professional associations based in the United States
Academic organizations based in the United States
Organizations established in 1930
Educational organizations based in the United States
Teacher associations based in the United States
Education-related professional associations
1930 establishments in the United States